Acrolophus cressoni (Cresson's grass tubeworm moth) is a moth of the family Acrolophidae. It is found in North America, including Alabama, Arizona, Arkansas, Florida, Georgia, Kentucky, Louisiana, Mississippi, New Mexico, North Carolina, Oklahoma, Tennessee and Texas.

The wingspan is about 19 mm.

References

Moths described in 1882
cressoni
Insects of the United States